Petra Kurbjuweit (born 9 November 1956) is a German gymnast. She competed in six events at the 1976 Summer Olympics.

References

1956 births
Living people
German female artistic gymnasts
Olympic gymnasts of West Germany
Gymnasts at the 1976 Summer Olympics
Sportspeople from Gelsenkirchen